Black Point is a northern hamlet in Saskatchewan situated on the southern shore of Lac La Loche close to the northern village of La Loche. It is accessible by road by Highway 956 which is off Highway 155.

The population of Black Point is 47 and is led by mayor Annette Petit. The northern settlement is an unincorporated community in the Northern Saskatchewan Administration District.

Demographics 

References 

Designated places in Saskatchewan
Division No. 18, Unorganized, Saskatchewan
Northern hamlets in Saskatchewan
Dene communities